Birra Kaon is a beer company, founded in Vlorë, Albania in 1995. A proprietary of T.E.A Company, it is the fourth-largest beer producer in the country.

References

Beer brands
Kaon
Drink companies of Albania